Jorge Manuel Ornelas Tiscareño (born December 14, 1991, in Aguascalientes City, Aguascalientes), known as Jorge Ornelas, is a Mexican professional footballer who plays for C.D. Tepatitlán de Morelos.

External links
 

Liga MX players
Living people
Mexican footballers
1991 births
People from Aguascalientes City
Association footballers not categorized by position
21st-century Mexican people